The Arkansas Razorbacks swimming and diving program is one of 19 teams at the University of Arkansas. The team is a member of the Southeastern Conference and is currently coached by Sean Schimmel.

NCAA Finishes 
Arkansas' highest finish at the NCAA Division I Women's Swimming and Diving Championships was 16th in 1985.

References 

Arkansas Razorbacks